Carlos Jhilmar Lora Saavedra (born 24 October 2000), better known as Jhilmar Lora, is a Peruvian professional footballer who plays as a right-back for Peruvian Primera División club Sporting Cristal and the Peru national team.

Early life 
Lora was born on October 24, 2000, in Callao. Growing up in a close-knit soccer-loving family, "Jhil" developed a passion for the sport from an early age, constantly playing in the Boterín neighborhood. At the age of four he joined the local club Alianza Lima located at the Liceo Naval Capitán de Navío Germán Astete, located in the La Perla district, 10 minutes from his home, where he was trained by Nill Gonzáles. Later, he was trained by Bruno Ferreira and in 2013 he was received by Professor Hitzvan Tazayco.

A lifelong supporter of Sporting Cristal, Lora joined the Lima club when he was eleven years old. During the eight years he played for the juniors, he won almost every junior tournament and was almost unbeatable with the youth team. Most of that group of players were very technical. He was happy about Jhilmar because of the conditions he is showing, because at that time, he did not stand out but suddenly at that time a forward or midfielder stood out. For his part, Conrad Flores, who directed him in the quarry and sub- 20 of Sporting Cristal maintained that Jhilmar Lora initially did not play as a right marker but in another position. "At the beginning he was a central back and Benjamin Villalta was the right back. So, due to their playing characteristics, I decided to change their position: Villalta as back and Lora as right back ".

Lora played in all competitions, he became friends with his teammates, among whom were Joao Grimaldo and Benjamin Villalta. Lora became an integral part of the Sporting Cristal youth team. During his first full season (2016), he was champion of the Reserve Tournament - Apertura y Clausura- and Copa Modelo Centenario. In his second season (2017), he was champion of the Reserve Tournament - Apertura- and Centennial Tournament Sub-17 Clausura, the final of this his team gave a 3–2 victory over Alianza Lima, Lora scored the winning goal after coming back from 0–2. A week later he would lose the national title to the Universitario. In his third season (2018) he was champion of the Reserve Tournament - Apertura-. His last season (2019) was champion of the Reserve Tournament - Apertura-, Lora in the middle of the year was promoted to the first team, however he had to be called to continue in the Copa Libertadores of his category the following year where he lost in phase of groups.

Club career

Sporting Cristal

2019-present: Rise to the first team 
During the 2019 season, On August 7, 2019, he signed his first professional contract and was transferred to the first team. At 19 years, and 16 days old, he made his debut for the first team in the championship match against Melgar, coming on as a substitute in the 61st minute instead of Renzo Revoredo. In the 2020 season, he played 4 times in the starting lineup in championship matches and at the end of the season became the champion of Peru with the club.

On January 31, 2021, Sporting Cristal confirmed the extension of the contract with Lora until the end of 2023. On March 13, he gave his first assist in his career to Christopher González in the match of the 1st round of the new season against the club Deportivo Binacional. On April 21, 2021, he made his debut in the Copa Libertadores in the match against São Paulo, coming on as a substitute in the 82nd minute. On July 14, 2021, he made his debut in the Copa Sudamericana in the round of 16 match against Arsenal de Sarandí, as a starter. His club went to the quarterfinals where they lost to Peñarol in both games, a 4-1 aggregate. On September 17, 2021, he gave his second assist in his career to Marcos Riquelme in the match of the 11th round of the new season against the club Universidad Técnica de Cajamarca. Jhilmar Lora would play the final against Club Alianza Lima where he obtained the runner-up with Cristal after losing with a 1-0 aggregate result. After a good season, Lora was part of the ideal eleven of the tournament.

During the preseason, Lora would play friendlies prior to the start of League 1. On February 5, he would debut in a 0–1 loss against Sport Huancayo.

International career

Peru

2021: Copa America debuts 
On April 27, 2021, coach Ricardo Gareca submitted a preliminary 50 player challenge for the Peru Copa América for the Copa América 2021, which included Jhilmar Lora. On May 21, he was first called up for the 2022 World Cup qualifier against Colombia and Ecuador. June 10 entered the final application of the national team for the Copa America in Brazil. In the quarterfinal match of the tournament against Paraguay, Lora made his debut for the national team, entering the field instead of Aldo Corzo in 90 + 2 minutes. The match ended with a score of 3: 3, and the Peru national team won on penalties, he also became the first Peruvian player born in the 21st century to make his debut in a Copa América. In subsequent matches, the semi-final against Brazil (0: 1) and the match for 3rd place against Colombia (2: 3), Lora entered the field instead of Corzo twice more and took fourth place with his national team at the end of the tournament.

On August 29, he was called up urgently for the qualifier for the 2022 World Cup against Uruguay, Venezuela and Brazil. On September 24, 2021, he was summoned to contest the triple date against Chile, Bolivia and Argentina. In the third match of the triple date against Argentina, Lora debuted with the national team in the FIFA World Cup qualifying round, entering the field as a starter. The match ended with a score of 1:0, in favor of Argentina, he also became the first Peruvian player born in the 21st century to debut in a Conmebol Classification for the Soccer World Cup.

At the end of 2021, Lora would be called up to play two pre-qualifying friendlies against Panama and Jamaica in January, both with victories. On January 21, the defender was summoned for the qualifying matches against Colombia and Ecuador, being a substitute in said matches. On March 14, the Argentine coach, Ricardo Gareca called him up again, this time against Uruguay and Paraguay, for the last dates of the qualifying rounds for Qatar.

Profile as a player

Playing style 
Jhilmar Lora commonly plays as a right-back and has been described as "great promise for Peruvian soccer." Due to his remarkable acceleration and creative abilities, this position allows him to shoot and center with his deft foot and assist his teammates.

Considered one of the best defenders of Peruvian soccer, Lora despite not being physically imposing, stands out in the air for his elevation and precision of the head, which makes him a notable defense in the ball plays in play; he is also a competent attacker. In addition to his defensive skills and his ability to assist his teammates, he is endowed with speed, and feels comfortable with the ball, possesses good technical ability, as well as a good distribution, which allows him to carry the ball forward, change the ball. I play with long balls or play from behind on the ground.It also has a remarkable acceleration, so it can move in the shortest possible time in a limited space.

Lora has earned accolades for his technical prowess and ability to excel both offensively and defensively, as well as his versatility, allowing him to deploy as a winger. In his youth, he often played as a central back, while later establishing himself as a lateral as his career progressed. Due to his wide range of skills, his Sporting Cristal coach, Roberto Mosquera, has compared him to one of the best Peruvian defenders, Nolberto Solano; he went on to describe him as "An excellent and interesting player in Peruvian soccer." In 2021, an opinion from Julio Cesar Uribe, citing him as "a player of international stature that Peru produced." Lora has also occasionally been deployed as a center-back or defender. Lora has been praised for his decisive performances in important matches, especially for Sporting Cristal, due to his tendency to assist crucial goals for his team, and is considered by several journalists and fans as one of the most reliable players in high competition and pressure situations thanks to his ability as a defender, his tactical sense, consistency and concentration of a game over the course of a season. His skills include his creativity, vision, passing, definition, touch, and technique, being refe Arid like a "promise" player.

Career statistics

Club

Honours

Club 
Sporting Cristal

 Liga 1: 2020
 Copa Bicentenario: 2021
 Torneo Apertura: 2021

References

External links

2000 births
Living people
People from Callao
Sportspeople from Callao
People from Lima
Footballers from Lima
Peruvian footballers
Peruvian Primera División players
Sporting Cristal footballers
Peru international footballers
Association football fullbacks
Association football wingers
Association football defenders
Association football utility players
2021 Copa América players